The Cathedral of Our Lady of Coromoto or The Cathedral Church of Punto Fijo, is located in the Comercio street in the center of Punto Fijo in Falcon state, in the north of the South American country of Venezuela. It belongs to the Diocese of Punto Fijo (Dioecesis Punctifixensis) which is based and was founded in 1951, being elevated to Cathedral in 1997.

The first priest assigned to the city of Punto Fijo was Father Andrés  M. Santiago S.J. in 1947 it is who motivates the faithful to build the temple. With different funds obtained through diferetes activities and collaborations requested to workers in Creole and Shell refineries, it was possible to buy the land. 1949 began the construction of the bases.

On September 8, 1951, is officially stands as Parish Our Lady of Coromoto and Father Andrew was appointed parish priest Monsignor Francisco José Iturriza.

See also
Roman Catholicism in Venezuela
Our Lady of Coromoto

References

Roman Catholic cathedrals in Venezuela
Buildings and structures in Falcón
Punto Fijo
Roman Catholic churches completed in 1951
20th-century Roman Catholic church buildings in Venezuela